The London and North Western Railway (LNWR) Class G2 is a class of 0-8-0 steam locomotives.  60 were built at Crewe Works in 1921–1922. Uniquely amongst classes of LNWR 8-coupled tender engines, they were not rebuilt from or into other classes. Somewhat confusingly, the LNWR Class G2a is sometimes considered a subclass, but not in this article. They were classified by the London, Midland and Scottish Railway (LMS) as 5, from 1928 7F.

Numbering
The LNWR used a lowest available number numbering system, meaning that numbers were somewhat haphazard.  After the grouping in 1923, the LMS renumbered them 9395-9454 in order of build date. All were inherited by British Railways (BR) upon nationalisation in 1948.  BR added 40000 to their numbers so that they became 49395-49454.

Withdrawal
The class were withdrawn between May 1959 and December 1964, with the first member of the class to be withdrawn being No. 49436 and the final being No. 49430.

Preservation

The first of the class, LNWR No. 485, LMS No. 9395, BR No. 49395 has been preserved and is part of the National Collection at the NRM. It had previously spent time at the Ironbridge Gorge Museum Trust's Blists Hill Victorian Town.

The locomotive is currently situated at the East Lancashire Railway where it is stored out of traffic awaiting a decision on its operational future.
Now at NRM Shildon.

References

Further reading

 Bob Essery & David Jenkinson An Illustrated Review of LMS Locomotives Vol. 2 Absorbed Pre-Group Classes Western and Central Divisions
 Edward Talbot, The London & North Western Railway Eight-Coupled Goods Engines
 Willie Yeadon, Yeadon's Compendium of LNWR Locomotives Vol 2 Goods Tender Engines

G2
0-8-0 locomotives
Standard gauge steam locomotives of Great Britain
Railway locomotives introduced in 1921
D h2 locomotives
Freight locomotives